The Lithuanian Women's A League (Lithuanian: Moterų A lyga) is Lithuania's top level women's football (soccer) league. The champion of the league qualifies for a spot in the UEFA Women's Champions League. The league is above the Lithuanian women football association's (LMFA) First League.

2022 teams
 Banga Gargždai (Gargždai)
 Vilnius (Vilnius) 
 FC Gintra (Šiauliai)
 Hegelmann (Kaunas)
 MFA Žalgiris-MRU (Vilnius) 
 Saned (new)

Format
The championship consists of 20 matchdays. The teams are playing each other 4 times. 2018 A league season started on 29 March and the last matchday will be 11 November.

Champions
A list of all champions.
1994:  Olimpija-Centras Kaunas
1994/95:  Politechnika Kaunas
1995/96:  Vilnius FM
1996/97:  Gabija-Politechnika Kaunas
1997/98:  Kristina Vilnius
1998/99:  Politechnika-Sika Kaunas
1999: Gintra Šiauliai
2000: Gintra Šiauliai
2001: Šventupė Ukmergė
2002: TexTilitė Ukmergė
2003: Gintra-Universitetas Šiauliai
2004: TexTilitė Ukmergė
2005: Gintra-Universitetas Šiauliai
2006: Gintra-Universitetas Šiauliai
2007: Gintra-Universitetas Šiauliai
2008: Gintra-Universitetas Šiauliai
2009: Gintra-Universitetas Šiauliai
2010: Gintra-Universitetas Šiauliai
2011: Gintra-Universitetas Šiauliai
2012: Gintra-Universitetas Šiauliai
2013: Gintra-Universitetas Šiauliai
2014: Gintra-Universitetas Šiauliai
2015: Gintra-Universitetas Šiauliai
2016: Gintra-Universitetas
2017: Gintra-Universitetas
2018: Gintra-Universitetas (17)
2019: Gintra Universitetas (18)
2020: Gintra-Univesitetas (19)
2021: FC Gintra (20)
2022: FC Gintra (21)

References

External links
Federation website
League at futbolinis.lt – scorers, yellow cards, statistics
League at uefa.com
women.soccerway.com

 
Women's football competitions in Lithuania
Women
Lith
Professional sports leagues in Lithuania